The following is a list of stations found within the Zhengzhou Metro.

Line 1

Line 2

Chengjiao line

Zhengzhou Metro